Marco Martins (born 1 June 1973) is a Brazilian fencer. He competed in the individual foil event at the 2000 Summer Olympics.

References

External links
 

1973 births
Living people
Brazilian male foil fencers
Olympic fencers of Brazil
Fencers at the 2000 Summer Olympics